Leïla Ben Ali (née Trabelsi; born 14 October 1956) is the widow of Zine El Abidine Ben Ali, who was President of Tunisia from 1987 to 2011. She married Ben Ali in 1992.

Leïla Ben Ali was the president of the Arab Women Organization and chair of the Basma Association, a charitable organization working to secure employment for the disabled. In July 2010, Mrs. Ben Ali founded SAIDA to improve care for cancer patients in Tunisia. During the Tunisian revolution in 2010–11, she fled with her husband and three children into exile in Saudi Arabia. During her time as First Lady of Tunisia, she is believed to have enriched herself and her family through gross corruption and embezzlement of state money to finance a lavish lifestyle, factors that contributed to the protests against the regime of Ben Ali at the end of 2010.  she is wanted by Interpol on behest of the Tunisian judiciary for high treason and money laundering.

Early life and family
Leïla Trabelsi is the daughter of Mohamed and Saïda Trabelsi. She has ten brothers and sisters.  A "hard hitting" 2009 book by French journalists Nicholas Beau and Catherine Graciet traced her rise from the daughter of a dried fruit seller to First Lady. Prior to her 1992 marriage to Ben Ali, she was a hairdresser with little formal education, partying hard in Paris. She was married for three years to Khelil Maaouia.  She then had an affair with industrial magnate, Farid Mokhtar, a friend of the Prime Minister who introduced her to the highest levels of Tunisian society.

After her romantic relationship and subsequent marriage to Tunisian President Zine El Abidine Ben Ali, she and her family rose to prominent positions in Tunisian business and became noted for their greed, power and ruthlessness. Leïla Ben Ali and most of her relatives fled Tunisia to Saudi Arabia, France, Canada and Qatar on 14 January 2011, when President Ben Ali was ousted.

Philanthropy
Leïla Ben Ali was active in philanthropy and humanitarian work in her role as First Lady of Tunisia. She founded the Basma Association in 2000 to help secure employment for the disabled, and has chaired the organization ever since. Under her leadership the association has provided micro-finance loans, secured employment for many and opened a center for the disabled in October 2010. The center provided technical training in a number of fields including computer science, embroidery, carpentry, theater and music.

She also started SAIDA, an initiative to improve cancer treatment, in 2010. She frequently gave speeches, was present at official ceremonies and occasionally read her husband's speeches. She regularly travelled with the president on official visits to other countries. Ben Ali was also active in S.O.S. Gammarth and El Karama, which provided care for orphans and promoted human rights, respectively.

Arab Women Organization
As president of the AWO, Leïla Ben Ali established the Arab Women's commission for International Humanitarian Law that served to promote international humanitarian law by increasing awareness and providing training programs for governments and humanitarian organizations. She also made domestic violence prevention a major priority of the AWO, and called for greater public attention and reporting of violence against women in the home. In an interview in Trends Magazine, she asserted the importance of Arab women in sustainable development and bettering the Arab women's image were her main objectives as president of the AWO.

Awards
She was recognized for her contributions to these organizations in a variety of publications. In 2000, she was selected as the "World Family Personality"; in 2003 deemed "Person of the Year" in the Russian magazine The World of the Woman, for her activities to promote social welfare and women's rights; and chosen as one of the world's 50 most influential Arabs by Middle East Magazine, a publication based in London. She was commended for her work with the AWO to increase women's capacity in all fields and positions, and for increasing cooperation among Arab states on women's issues. She was also recognized by the World Association of Women Entrepreneurs (FCEM) for her role in empowering women in economic development.

Corruption

She became a lightning rod for dissatisfaction within a Tunisian society disgusted with the rise of her immediate family and Trabelsi family. Two French authors wrote an extensive book titled "La regente de Carthage" detailing the corruption of Leïla, her family and in-laws. According to the French newspaper Le Monde Diplomatique, Leïla Ben Ali symbolizes the "greed" of the presidential family. An American diplomatic cable leaked by WikiLeaks described how Ambassador Robert F. Godec often heard "barbs about their lack of education, low social status and conspicuous consumption." During the 2010–2011 Tunisian protests, rioters specifically targeted homes they believed belonged to the Trabelsi extended family. The Swiss government announced that it was freezing millions of dollars held in bank accounts by her family.

On 20 June 2011, Zine El Abidine Ben Ali and Leïla Ben Ali were sentenced to 35 years in prison in absentia after being found guilty of theft and unlawful possession of cash and jewellery. A report came out that Leïla may have attempted suicide by poisoning herself in her residence in Abha.

Personal life
She and her husband had three children together: Nesrine (born out of wedlock; recognized by her father, married to Mohammad Sakher El Materi), Halima and Mohamed Zine El Abidine. The couple were together until 19 September 2019, when the former president died in Saudi Arabia.

References

External links

21st-century Tunisian criminals
1956 births
Living people
First Ladies of Tunisia
Fugitives wanted on organised crime charges
People convicted of theft
People from Tunis
People of the Tunisian Revolution
Tunisian exiles
Tunisian women